The Robertson Brothers is an Australian band of brothers who are best known for singing the Home and Away theme song, broadcast from 2000 to 2006.

At the ARIA Music Awards of 1994, their debut single "I Know Why" was nominated for ARIA Award for Best New Talent.

The Robertson Brothers have been performing just on 30 years; including appearing at the Sydney 2000 Olympic Games Opening Ceremony, singing the Channel 7 'Home and Away' theme song, plus as backing vocalists on Australia's top rating talent show, Australian Idol. The Robertson Brother have received 16 ACE Awards, 8 MO Awards plus were nominated for 1 ARIA Award and 1 Golden Guitar Award.They have toured nationally, and around world supporting the likes of ELO, America and John Denver. They have signed recording deals to BMG, EMI and currently SONY. With multi-platinum sales, they have achieved Top 10 hits in Malaysia, Philippines, Singapore, Indonesia and Lebanon. They have featured on radio for over 20 years via the nationally syndicated Ray Hadley Morning Show; creating sporting and political parodies. They have also sung on and/or written and produced a plethora of radio and television advertising campaigns for direct clients. 

Apart from the many gigs over the years, The Robertson Brothers have also created themed shows that pay homage to specific musical eras. These include, 70s tribute 'Sharing the Night', 'The Everly Brothers Tribute' and currently their '1960s Variety TV Show'.

Discography

Studio albums

Live albums

Singles

Members
 Geoff Robertson (1992–present)
 Ben Robertson (1992–present)
 Stuart Robertson (1992–2004 & 2019-present)
 Anton Aktila (2004–2011)

Awards

ARIA Music Awards
The ARIA Music Awards is an annual awards ceremony that recognises excellence, innovation, and achievement across all genres of Australian music.

|-
| 1994
| "I Know Why"
| ARIA Award for Best New Talent
| 
|-

Mo Awards
The Australian Entertainment Mo Awards (commonly known informally as the Mo Awards), were annual Australian entertainment industry awards. They recognise achievements in live entertainment in Australia from 1975 to 2016. The Robertson Brothers won eight awards in that time.
 (wins only)
|-
| 2000
| The Robertson Brothers 
| Variety Duo/Trio of the Year 
| 
|-
| 2001
| The Robertson Brothers 
| Variety Duo/Trio of the Year 
| 
|-
| 2002
| The Robertson Brothers 
| Variety Duo/Trio of the Year 
| 
|-
| 2003
| The Robertson Brothers 
| Variety Duo/Trio of the Year 
| 
|-
| 2007
| The Robertson Brothers 
| Variety Duo/Trio of the Year 
| 
|-
| 2008
| The Robertson Brothers
| Vocal Group of the Year
| 
|-
| 2009
| The Robertson Brothers
| Vocal Group of the Year
| 
|-
| 2012
| The Robertson Brothers
| Best Harmony/ Vocal Group of the Year
| 
|-

References

External links
 Official website

Australian pop music groups
Sibling musical trios
Australian musical trios
Musical groups disestablished in 1992